Brookdale is a suburb of Perth, Western Australia, located within the City of Armadale. Formerly part of the district of Wungong, Brookdale was gazetted in 1997.

Schools
 Gwynne Park Primary School
 Xavier Catholic School (2005)
Australian Christian College – Darling Downs

References

External links

Suburbs of Perth, Western Australia
Suburbs in the City of Armadale